Cory Wade (born May 6, 1936) former record producer, director of A&R, songwriter, publisher, and recording studio manager. He has produced more than 35 gold and platinum records from 1973 to 1982, and has won numerous music industry awards, a Grammy Award nomination, and two American Music Award nominations.

Wade was born in Indianapolis, Indiana, United States. He is best known for producing various hits within the disco genre in the 1970s and 1980s. As producer for TK Records, Wade produced the 1977 single "Do Ya Wanna Get Funky with Me," by Peter Brown, which became the first 12-inch single to sell a million copies. Cory Wade also produced hit recordings for Foxy, including "Get Off", selling more than a million 12-inch and album copies. T-Connection also sold into the millions with a number of their disco-funk singles and albums. Wade also produced a hit album for local artists,  Tiger; two brothers and their group who came from the Florida Everglades-based Miccosukee Native American Tribe. He worked with other TK Artists such as George and Gwen McCrae, Betty Wright, Wildflower, Timmy Thomas, Funk Machine, KC and the Sunshine Band, Steve Gordon and Aaron Dey. Wade produced over 100 top-selling records. Notably, his first gold record came from the newly formed 20th Century Fox Records in 1972, when he produced the Brighter Side of Darkness track "Love Jones".

After pursuing his   songwriting career from 1983 to 1991, Wade made a sudden comeback with a successful remake of Peter Brown's hit, "Crank it Up", recorded by singer and dancer Lawrence Leritz, which hit the dance market. Early into his career in 1962, Wade himself became a self-produced recording artist with several regional hits, until he entered the United States Army in August 1963. After returning from his military service Wade re-entered the music field recording "Letter From a Teenage Son", which was released on Mercury Records.

As a record producer, Wade has covered music in many fields such as disco, pop, R&B, funk, Christian, rock, and multiple instrumentals, including "Disco Magic" by T-Connection.

During his long career in the entertainment industry, Wade produced music for the following music recording labels worldwide: TK Records, Atlantic Records, Columbia Records, RCA, Epic Records, Phillips, Mercury, Priority, 20th Century Fox Records, Odyssey, Capitol Records, K-Tel, Polygram, MCA, Ariola, and Polydor.

Wade later worked on several music soundtracks for motion picture film projects, while also writing the screenplays. He resides in Walls, Mississippi, and hosted two radio shows broadcast on WCET Radio and syndicated in over 24 major markets worldwide.

References

External links
Disco-Disco
MSN Music
Discogs.com listing
Crank It Up

1936 births
Living people
Record producers from Indiana
Songwriters from Indiana
American disco musicians
People from Indianapolis